This an alphabetical List of ancient Carthaginians. These include all citizens of ancient Carthage remembered in history, before the final Roman destruction of the state.

Note that some persons may be listed multiple times, once for each part of the name.



B 
 Bomilcar — commander in the First Punic War
 Bomilcar — suffete and commander in the Second Punic War
 Bomilcar — commander in the Second Punic War
 Bodo — senator and naval commander
 Bostar — ambassador sent by Hannibal to Philip V of Macedon in 215 BCE
 Bostar — governor of Capua with Hanno in 211 BCE

C 
 Carthalo (fl. 209 BC) — commander
 Clitomachus (born Hasdrubal) — philosopher

D 
 Dido — according to ancient Greek and Roman sources the founder and first queen of Carthage

G 
 Gisco of Carthage
 Gisgo (son of Hanno I) — son of Hanno I the Great, general
 Gisgo (battle of Cannae) — noted officer before the Battle of Cannae

H 

 Hamilcar I of Carthage (r. 510–480 BCE) — king
 Hamilcar II of Carthage
 Hamilcar, son of Hanno — commander at the Battle of Himera in 480 BC during the First Sicilian War
 Hamilcar — Punic strategus against Timoleon of Syracuse
 Hamilcar — brother of Gisco (3) and possibly brother of Hanno (9) with whom he was executed in the middle of the 4th century BC (Polyen. Strat. V 11)
 Hamilcar the Rhodian — possibly Carthaginian spy in the entourage of Alexander the Great, executed when returning to Carthage
 Hamilcar, son of Gisgo and grandson to Hanno the Great (d. 309 BC) — commander in the Third Sicilian War, captured during the Siege of Syracuse and then killed in 309 BC
 Hamilcar — strategus during the First Punic War. Not identical with the homonym officer mentioned by Diod. XXIV 12. ELip
 Hamilcar —  commander during the First Punic War
 Hamilcar Barca (c. 270–228 BC) — general during and after the First Punic War (264–241 BC). Father of Hannibal of the Second Punic War
 Hannibal (247–183/182 BC) — general who fought the Roman Republic in the Second Punic War
 Hannibal Mago (died 406 BC) — shofet (magistrate) of Carthage in 410 BC
 Hannibal Gisco (died 258 BC) — military commander in the First Punic War
 Hannibal the Rhodian — ship captain during the siege of Lilybaeum in the First Punic War
 Hannibal (Mercenary War) (died 238 BC) — general
 Hannibal Monomachus — fought alongside the famous Hannibal
 Hanno the Elder (died 204 BC) — Carthaginian general
 Hanno I the Great (4th century BC) — Carthaginian politician and military leader
 Hanno II the Great (3rd century BC) — wealthy Carthaginian aristocrat
 Hanno III the Great (2nd century BC) — ultra-conservative Carthaginian politician
 Hanno the Navigator — Carthaginian explorer
 Hanno, son of Hannibal — Carthaginian general in the First Punic War
 Hanno, Messana garrison commander — Carthaginian general in The First Punic War
 Hanno, son of Bomilcar — Carthaginian officer in the Second Punic War
 Hasdrubal I of Carthage — Magonid king of Ancient Carthage 530–510 BC
 Hasdrubal the Fair (c. 270 BC – 221 BC), son-in-law of Hamilcar Barca
 Hasdrubal Barca (245–207 BC), son of Hamilcar Barca and brother of Hannibal and Mago
 Hasdrubal Gisco Gisgonis (died 202 BC), another commander in the Second Punic War, father of Sophonisba
 Hasdrubal the Bald — general in the Second Punic War
 Hasdrubal the Boetharch — general of Punic forces in the Third Punic War c. 146 BC
 Hasdrubal (quartermaster) — officer in the Second Punic War c. 218 BC
 Hasdrubal (187/6–110/09 BC; later Clitomachus) — philosopher (187/6–110/09 BC)
 Himilco — navigator and explorer who lived during the height of Carthaginian power in the late 6th century BC
 Himilco (general)
 Himilco (fl. 3rd century BC) - general in Sicily during the Second Punic War.

M 
 Mago I of Carthage
 Mago II of Carthage
 Mago III of Carthage
 Mago Barca
 Mago (fleet commander) — commander of the Carthaginian fleet under Himilco in the war against Dionysius I of Syracuse, 396 BCE
 Mago (general) — commander of the Carthaginian fleet and army in Sicily in 344 BC
 Mago (agricultural writer) — writer and author of an agricultural manual in Punic
 Malchus I (c. 556–550 BC) — king

P
 Phameas - Carthaginian cavalry officer in the Third Punic War

S 
 Sophonisba — noblewoman, daughter of Hasdrubal Gisco Gisgonis (son of Gisco), poisoned herself to avoid humiliation in a Roman triumph

See also
 List of monarchs of Carthage
 List of patriarchs, archbishops and bishops of Carthage
 Politics of Ancient Carthage

Literature

Carthaginians
Carthaginian